Ilyino is a rural locality (a village) in Posyolok Dobryatino, Gus-Khrustalny District, Vladimir Oblast, Russia. The population was 414 as of 2010. There are 7 streets.

Geography 
Ilyino is located 56 km southeast of Gus-Khrustalny (the district's administrative centre) by road. Alfyorovo is the nearest rural locality.

References 

Rural localities in Gus-Khrustalny District
Melenkovsky Uyezd